Living on the Edge of the World may refer to:

"Living on the Edge of the World", a song by Bruce Springsteen on his 1998 album Tracks
Living on the Edge of the World, a collection of short stories by Joshua Braff